is a Japanese manga series written and illustrated by Yuu Morikawa. It has been serialized on the Pixiv website since December 2018, with its chapters collected into four tankōbon volumes as of February 2022. An anime television series adaptation by Shin-Ei Animation and SynergySP has been announced.

Characters

Media

Manga
Written and illustrated by Yuu Morikawa, Mr. Villain's Day Off began serialization on the Pixiv website on December 15, 2018. As of February 2022, four tankōbon volumes have been released by Square Enix under its Gangan Comics Pixiv imprint. A drama CD adaptation was released by Frontier Works on January 27, 2021.

The series is published digitally in English in the global version of Square Enix's Manga Up! website. In March 2023, Square Enix Manga & Books announced that it licensed the series for print publication, with the first volume set to be released on August 15 of the same year.

Volume list

Anime
An anime television series adaptation was announced on February 24, 2023. It is produced by Shin-Ei Animation and SynergySP, and directed by Yoshinori Odaka, with scripts supervised by Midori Gotō, character designs handled by Tomomi Shimazaki, and music composed by Nobuaki Nobusawa.

References

External links
  
  
 

Anime series based on manga
Comedy anime and manga
Gangan Comics manga
Japanese comedy webcomics
Josei manga
Shin-Ei Animation
Supervillain comics
Supervillain television shows
Upcoming anime television series
Webcomics in print